Smoky black (or black carrying cream) is a hair coat color of horses which is not visually identifiable: the horse appears black.  Smoky black is produced by the action of a heterozygous (single copy) cream gene on an underlying black coat color.  Therefore, smoky black is a member of the cream family of coat color dilutions, and found in horse populations that have other cream gene-based colors such as palomino, buckskin, perlino, cremello and smoky cream.  All smoky blacks must have at least one parent with the cream gene, and a smoky black can only be verified through DNA testing or parentage.

A smoky black horse usually appears to be a black horse and the dilution gene dilution factor is not visible. The coat fading that has previously been attributed to the presence of cream on black is now known to be the result of nd1, a mutation of the dun gene found in horses that can sometimes cause a slight dilution and possible primitives. Conversely, just because a black horse may fade in the sun does not necessarily prove or disprove that it is a smoky black. Sun-fading, sweat-bleaching, nutritional balance/imbalance, normal shade variation can also be responsible for different 'shades of black.' 

Two copies of the cream gene on a black base coat produce a smoky cream, a cream-colored horse which is visually difficult to distinguish from a perlino or cremello, but can be identified through DNA testing.

Identification

Smoky black foals must always have at least one parent with the cream dilute gene and at least one parent that carries the "E" extension gene associated with black coloring.  This could occur one of two ways: A foal could have a smoky black parent or a buckskin parent carrying both genes within a single horse.  A smoky black could also be produced by breeding one horse with only the cream dilution, such as a palomino, to a bay or black horse carrying only the extension gene, but no cream dilution.  As foals, smoky blacks look identical to black foals without cream.

Much the same with varying shades of other horse colors, black horses and black carrying cream horses can appear as the darkest shade of black, to being misidentified as bay. This has nothing to do with the presence of cream as black horses are often misidentified as black carrying cream because of other environmental factors such as sun-fading or bleaching. The palest can be mistaken for dull bays or liver chestnuts, especially if exposed to the elements.  Bleaching due to the elements means that the legs retain their color better, and can take on an appearance of having dark points like a bay horse.

Black mimics
 Dark bay: When black horses fade from exposure to the elements, their legs usually retain their color, giving them the appearance of a bay or brown horse with black points. 
 Black: Genetically black horses may still develop a sun-bleached coat, usually due to issues related to management and nutrition, though in some cases there may also be genetic factors as nd1 contributing.  A smoky black looks identical to a black horse without cream, and only pedigree analysis or genetic testing can distinguish between the two.
 Seal brown: The just off-black coat color of true seal browns can sometimes be misidentified as black, or vice versa.
 Liver chestnut: The palest, most evenly bleached blacks may mimic the darkest shades of chestnut.

Genetic identification

Genetically, smoky blacks are black horses heterozygous for the cream gene. The mutation that produces the cream colors is on the MATP gene on equine chromosome 21 (ECA21), and is an incomplete dominant trait. Incomplete dominant traits differ from recessive traits, which are only "visible" in the homozygous state, and simple dominant traits, which look just the same in the homozygous and heterozygous states. Instead, the MATP mutation is visible only on pheomelanin in the heterozygous state in horses, but in eumelanin and pheomelanin in the homozygous state. 

The location of the cream gene was published in 2003 and there now exists a DNA test for the cream gene.

See also
Cream gene
Dilution gene
Smoky cream

References

 Smoky Black Colorful Morgans. Accessed May 28, 2008.
 Color and Markings Guidelines Accessed May 28, 2008.
 Smoky Black in Icelandic Horses Accessed May 28, 2008.
 

Horse coat colors
smoky_black